Flaminio Malaguti is an Italian professional poker player residing in Las Vegas, NV.

Poker 
Malaguti placed 6th in the 2009 World Series of Poker $1,500 Limit Hold’em Shootout.
In 2012, he completed four world record poker achievements including 15 cashes in a single month and 51 cashes, 20 first place tournament wins, and 39 final tables in a calendar year. In 2013, he had 73 ITM (in the money) tournament finishes, which lead to him obtaining the all-time world record for most ITMs in a calendar year. Malaguti won the 2013 WSOP Deepstack Player of the Year award after finishing with the most points out of all players competing in a specific series of WSOP tournaments between May 29 and June 30, 2013. He placed 503rd in the 2017 WSOP main event. As of 2018, Malaguti has earned $393,751 through sanctioned poker tournaments. Malaguti has 109 first place tournament wins, the all-time world record for most first place tournament wins in the history of poker.

Personal life 
Malaguti lives in Las Vegas, NV and has a daughter, singer-songwriter ZaZa Maree. He is the owner of the Rock 'n' Roll Cafe on the Las Vegas strip.

References 

Italian poker players
Living people
Year of birth missing (living people)
People from Las Vegas